David Montgomery (born February 8, 1937) is an American photographer known for his portraits of the rich and famous. He studied music at the Juilliard School of Music. He was an assistant to photographer Lester Bookbinder in New York and accompanied him on a working visit to the United Kingdom in the early 1960s and stayed.

Photograph archive
Montgomery's photographic subjects have included Bill Clinton, Lucian Freud, Mick Jagger, Jimi Hendrix, Margaret Thatcher, Peter O'Toole and Andy Warhol. His photographs of Andy Warhol have been included in The Andy Warhol Museum in Pittsburgh. For his photograph of Hendrix, which is shown in the inside cover of the 1968 album Electric Ladyland, Montgomery started a fire using a can of petrol to photograph flames behind Hendrix.  He also photographed Queen Elizabeth II in 1967, being the first American to do so, after which he said that he was never frightened of a subject again, going on to photograph five Prime Ministers.

Personal life
Montgomery has been married twice. With his first wife, Caroline, he has two daughters, Rebecca Montgomery and Krishna Montgomery. He married his second wife, Martine (née King), in 1982. They have a daughter Marissa Montgomery and a son Max Montgomery, who is also a photographer. He lives with his wife in a five-bedroom Victorian terraced house in Chelsea, London. For a time, he collected guitars as a hobby, and at one time he owned about 20 of them. He has since sold most of them, and by 2014 he had only two remaining.

References

1937 births
Living people
Album-cover and concert-poster artists
American photographers
Jimi Hendrix
Juilliard School alumni
People from Brooklyn